The Fish Marketing Organisation (FMO) is a statutory body of Hong Kong, administered by the Agriculture, Fisheries and Conservation Department.

The Fish Marketing Organisation was established as a self-financing non-profit-making organisation under the Marine Fish (Marketing) Ordinance, Cap 291 to provide wholesale marketing services through the operation of wholesale fish markets.

Wholesale fish markets
The FMO operates seven wholesale fish markets in Aberdeen, Shau Kei Wan, Kwun Tong, Cheung Sha Wan, Castle Peak (Tuen Mun), Tai Po and Sai Kung.

Schools
The Fish Marketing Organisation was historically also operating schools for the children of fishermen. The first such schools were established by the FMO in 1947 and 1948. By 1980, there were 15 such schools, mostly primary schools and one secondary school.

See also
 Tsing Yi Fishermen's Children's Primary School
 Tanka people

References

External links

 Official website 

Statutory bodies in Hong Kong
Fishing in China